Putharachal is a village in India, Tamil Nadu, Tirupur district. 15 km from town of Palladam. It has a population of 2000. It has regular bus transportation to all near major cities of west Tamil Nadu such as Coimbatore, Madurai, Dharapuram, Tirupur.

Agriculture 
Agriculture is the main occupation here. The major crops sown are onion, corn, banana, and market vegetables such as tomato, brinjal, ladies finger, coriander. There is no river flowing through and hence only rain water and groundwater are the source of irrigation. People also work in nearby textile mills.

Nature 
The village is a beautiful place and has many natural resources. It comes in Palladam - Dharapuram Rd. Many canals are here including small distributaries of these canals.

Culture

Language
The languages spoken are Tamil, Telugu, Kannada, and English.

Religion
Most of the population are Hindus but some families have converted to Christianity.

Temple
Sri Akilandeswari Udanamar Soleswarar Temple is the One and Only Famous Lord Shiva Temple Around Palladam Taluk.

108 Kala Bairavar Temple is also an important among locals.

Public services
There are two Mandapams in here. There is a Government Middle School for which students come from nearby villages. There are no libraries here.

Government

The village falls under Palladam constituency in state legislature. 

There are many lands for cultivating. There is a old bridge which is broken but now it is carrying a lot of water. 
Villages in Tiruppur district